The Goal of the Year in Germany is, like the Goal of the Month (Tor des Monats), the Goal of the Decade and Goal of the Century, an individual football award selected by spectators of the Sportschau (ARD German TV), among spectacular or important football goals scored in or for Germany.

Klaus Fischer won it three times; his 1977  "Bicycle kick" was also pronounced Goal of the Century. He scored it on 16 November 1977 in the international game of Germany versus Switzerland in the Neckarstadion, Stuttgart.

Details
The Goal of the Month Award and its sister event, the Goal of the Year Award, were incepted in 1971 by the German TV station ARD, one of two public broadcasting channels. Each month, the GotM is held, and five especially spectacular, unusual or important goals are shortlisted for the viewers to vote on. Initially votes were only cast per mail, but nowadays votes are commonly made by telephone or over the Internet. The winner gets a golden plaque which is one of the most-sought individual awards in German football.

The 12 winners are then eligible for the big annual event, the GotY Award. Again, the goal with the most votes wins. Parallel to this, the 10 annual winners may participate in the Goal of the Decade Award, and in 1999, the Goal of the Decade of the 70s, 80s and 90s squared off for the Goal of the Century Award, see above.

Winners

Goal of the Year scorers

Goal of the Decade
 1970s: Klaus Fischer (1977) - bicycle kick
 1980s: Klaus Augenthaler (1989) - goal from the middle circle
 1990s: Bernd Schuster (1994) - goal from the middle circle

Goal of the Century
 Klaus Fischer (1970s)

Notable cases
In the most cases, spectacular and flashy goals win the Goal of the Year Award. But also Oliver Bierhoff's decisive goal to win the 1996 European Football Championship and Nia Künzer's header goal in the FIFA Women's World Cup 2003 were elected GotYs despite being rather unspectacular save for the circumstances.
Bernd Schuster once managed to score the first, second and third most popular goal in the 1994 edition of Goal of the Year Award.
Klaus Fischer scored the Goal of the Year in 1975, 1977 and 1982, and is the only player to have won three times. His 1982 GotY came in the 1982 FIFA World Cup semifinals against France, equalizing with a bicycle kick in the 108th minute. Two-time winners are Günter Netzer, Karl-Heinz Rummenigge, Gerd Müller, Lothar Matthäus and Raúl.
Günter Netzer (1972 and 1973) and Karl-Heinz Rummenigge (1980 and 1981) are the only players to score two consecutive Goals of the Year.
The oldest player was the 79-year-old Kurt Meyer, the only woman yet is Nia Künzer.
Twice, own goals have won the Goal of the Month Award. Helmut Winklhofer once spectacularly smashed a wild 20-metre kick into his own goal, and another time, a horrified Frank Rohde saw his goalie kicking over his harmless back-pass.

References

External links
  ARD-Sportschau
  Klaus Fischers Goal of the Century l

Association football goal of the year awards
Kicker-Torjägerkanone Award winners
Football in Germany lists
German football trophies and awards
Awards established in 1971
1971 establishments in West Germany